Road to the Royal Albert Hall is the fourth studio album by English boy band Collabro. It was released on 31 August 2018 by Peak Productions. The album peaked at number nineteen on the UK Albums Chart.

Tour
In June 2018, the band announced a fifty-one date UK tour for 2019. The tour started on 10 February in South Shields and ended on 20 April at the Royal Albert Hall in London.

Commercial performance
On 3 September 2018 the album was at number eleven on the Official Chart Update. On 7 September 2018, Road to the Royal Albert Hall entered the UK Albums Chart at number nineteen, making it the bands fourth top twenty album in the UK.

Track listing

Charts

Release history

References

2018 albums
Collabro albums